Arirang Radio (stylized as arirang) is an English-language South Korean television network based in Seoul and aimed at an overseas audience. It is operated by the Korea International Broadcasting Foundation and is financially supported by the Ministry of Culture, Sports and Tourism. The channel, which airs in 103 countries, aims to offer an extensive and informative view of Korea Peninsula affairs, as well as world issues from a global perspective.

The channel airs different programming in different countries, but generally airs news, cultural programs, educational shows and documentaries.

Its flagship news programs feature timely current affairs stories, in-depth interviews with world experts and prominent individuals.

History 
Arirang International Broadcasting Corporation began airing on September 1, 2003. It was operated by the non-profit Korea International Broadcasting Foundation, which was created by Article 32 of the South Korean Civil Code on April 10, 1996. Initially, the channel was available only on cable and satellite television in South Korea and was targeted to foreigners living in or visiting the country.

Arirang International Broadcasting Corporation has three channels for overseas viewers. Arirang World was established as a satellite television channel in 1999 and is broadcast in English, Chinese, Spanish, Korean, Arabic, Russian, Vietnamese, and Indonesian. Arirang UN was established in 2015, and is broadcast in English. As of 2018, the channels are broadcast in 103 countries.

Coverage
Arirang International Broadcasting Corporation provides subtitle services in a variety of different languages in order to interact closely with overseas viewers.

(English, Chinese, Spanish, Arabic, Russian, Vietnamese, Indonesian)

Arirang News 
Arirang Radios flagship news program airs 7 times a day, including two interview shows In-Depth and Global Insight. Interviews range from OECD Secretary General José Ángel Gurría to former NBA star Dennis Rodman.

See also 
 KBS World (TV channel)
 KBS World Radio
 Arirang TV
 List of programs broadcast by Arirang Radio
 Television in South Korea

References

 Satellite listings: 
 IPTV listings: Provider websites and

External links 
 

Radio stations in South Korea
Radio
Korean-language radio stations
Radio stations established in 2003
Chinese popular culture
South Korean popular culture
News and talk radio stations